David Mark Ferguson (born 28 February 1976 in North Shields) is a British heavyweight boxer based in Wallsend, England. His record stands at 12 wins and 3 loss after 8 bouts.

Ferguson competed in the "Prizefighter" competition at York Hall, Bethnal Green. He beat Billy Bessey in the opening round, before losing to Martin Rogan, the eventual winner, in the semi-final.

He also competed in the second "Prizefighter" competition in Newcastle-upon-Tyne on 12 September 2008. He went out on a split decision to Luke Simpkin in the opening round.

References

External links
 
 Dave Ferguson profile at BritishBoxing.net

1976 births
Living people
Sportspeople from North Shields
Sportspeople from Wallsend
English male boxers
Heavyweight boxers
Prizefighter contestants